Mellow Mood is an Italian reggae band from Pordenone, Italy that formed in 2005.

History
Mellow Mood first formed in 2005 when most members were in high school together, led by twins Jacopo and Lorenzo Garzia. 

The band officially debuted in 2009 with their first studio album, Move!, produced by Paolo Baldini, who was later to become their sound architect. The album was intended to be their first "move" on the reggae scene and gained unexpected international success. Thanks to their heartfelt live shows, Rototom Sunsplash named Mellow Mood "best Italian reggae band", and ranked them third at European level in the same year. The two singles off the album, "Only You" and "Dance Inna Babylon", now have a total of more than fifty million views on YouTube.

After a line-up change, Mellow Mood went back into the studio with Baldini to record Well Well Well, and were signed by Italy's most important independent label, La Tempesta, in 2012. Sailing through roots-reggae, rocksteady and tribal clubbing, Mellow Mood proved to be among the protagonists of a new generation of reggae artists hailing from all over the world. A major European tour followed and led the band to play in 12 countries, performing at important festivals like Rototom Sunsplash, Sziget Festival, and Reggae Camp.

Mellow Mood then released two albums, Twinz and 2 The World in 2014 and 2015 respectively. Produced by Paolo Baldini and published by La Tempesta, the albums are enriched by international collaborations (Tanya Stephens, Jah9, Richie Campbell, Hempress Sativa, Sr. Wilson, Forelock, and KG Man, among others) and couple the rediscovery of roots music with a deeper knowledge of the most recent Jamaican sounds.

In late 2015, Mellow Mood also celebrated the birth of their own sub-label, La Tempesta Dub (to release the band's future works) with a touring mini-festival featuring international guests.

Mellow Mood kept busy touring Europe and America intensively in 2016 and 2017, performing at many of the most important reggae events of both continents.

In 2020, Mellow Mood was one of many reggae bands that were featured on Collie Buddz Cali Roots Riddim 2020 album, which included their song "Unstoppable".

Mellow Mood was featured on Fortunate Youth's 2021 single, "Around The World".

Lineup

Current members
 Jacopo Garzia – Vocals, Guitar (2005–present)
 Lorenzo Garzia – Vocals, Guitar (2005–present)
 Giulio Frausin – Bass, Vocals (2005–present)
 Filippo Buresta – Keyboards (2011–present)
 Antonio Cicci – Drums (2015–present)

Former members
 Romeo Enrico Bernardini – Keyboards (2005–2011)
 Stefano Salmaso – Saxophone (2005–2012)
 Roberto Dazzan – Trumpet (2005–2013)

Discography

Albums 
 2009 - Move!
 2012 - Well Well Well
 2014 - Twinz
 2015 - 2 the World
 2018 - Large
 2022 - Mañana

Singles 
 2010 - "Dance inna babylon"
 2010 - "Only You"
 2012 - "Inna Jail"
 2012 - "She's So Nice"
 2012 - "Refugee"
 2012 - "Free Marijuana" feat. Damas Music
 2013 - "Show Us"
 2013 - "Do mi Thing"
 2013 - "Informers" feat. KG Man
 2013 - "Dig Dig Dig"
 2013 - "Extra Love" feat. Tanya Stephens
 2014 - "Inna Jamaica" feat. Richie Campbell
 2015 - "Inna Jamaica pt.2" feat. Hempress Sativa & Forelock
 2015 - "Criminal" feat. Andrew I

Collaborations 
 2010 - "Sensi" (Africa Unite)
 2012 - "Nel giardino dei fantasmi" (Tre Allegri Ragazzi Morti)
 2022 - "Just One" (Quartiere Coffee)

Awards 
 2009 - Italian Reggae Contest of Rototom Sunsplash.

References

External links 

Official site

Italian reggae musical groups